The Erskine River is a river in southwestern Victoria, Australia.  It arises in the Otway Ranges and enters Bass Strait to the east of Cape Otway through the town of Lorne. The Erskine River above the falls is known for its high diversity of native fish species and low occurrence of introduced species.

See also
Great Ocean Road

References

Corangamite catchment
Rivers of Barwon South West (region)
Otway Ranges